Coalla is a department or commune of Gnagna Province in northern Burkina Faso. Its capital lies at the town of Coalla. It has an area of 1,957 km2.

Towns and villages

References

Departments of Burkina Faso
Gnagna Province